Georgi Sarmov (born 7 September 1985) is a Bulgarian former professional footballer who played as a central midfielder.

Career

Naftex
Between 2004 and 2006 Sarmov played for Naftex Burgas, making 43 league appearances and scoring 2 goals.

Levski Sofia
He became a Champion of Bulgaria in 2009.
During 2009/2010 season, Levski qualified for UEFA Europa League group stage. In 2009/2010 season, Levski achieved qualifying for UEFA Europa League, becoming 3rd in the final ranking.

Kasımpaşa S.K.
On 17 May 2010, Sarmov together with his teammate Nikolay Dimitrov signed for Kasımpaşa S.K. for five years.

Beroe
In January 2016, Sarmov signed with Beroe Stara Zagora.

Etar
On 4 August 2017, Sarmov signed with Etar Veliko Tarnovo.

Chemnitz
In late April 2019, Sarmov was unveiled as the first signing of German club Chemnitzer FC for the 2019/2020 season.

International career
He debuted for Bulgaria national football team on 26 March 2008 against Finland, appearing as a late substitute for Dimitar Berbatov. The result of the match was 2:1 with a win for Bulgaria.

Honours 
Levski Sofia
 Bulgarian league (2): 2006–07, 2008–09
 Bulgarian Cup: 2006–07
 Bulgarian Supercup (2): 2007, 2009

References

External links 
 
 Profile at LevskiSofia.info
 
 

1985 births
Living people
Sportspeople from Burgas
Bulgarian footballers
Bulgaria under-21 international footballers
Bulgaria international footballers
Association football midfielders
Neftochimic Burgas players
PFC Levski Sofia players
Kasımpaşa S.K. footballers
Botev Plovdiv players
ACS Poli Timișoara players
PFC Beroe Stara Zagora players
FC Dacia Chișinău players
SFC Etar Veliko Tarnovo players
Chemnitzer FC players
FC Vitosha Bistritsa players
FC Septemvri Sofia players
First Professional Football League (Bulgaria) players
Süper Lig players
TFF First League players
Liga I players
Moldovan Super Liga players
3. Liga players
Bulgarian expatriate footballers
Bulgarian expatriate sportspeople in Turkey
Bulgarian expatriate sportspeople in Romania
Bulgarian expatriate sportspeople in Moldova
Bulgarian expatriate sportspeople in Germany
Expatriate footballers in Turkey
Expatriate footballers in Romania
Expatriate footballers in Moldova
Expatriate footballers in Germany